Trigonalidae is one of the more unusual families of hymenopteran insects, of indeterminate affinity within the suborder Apocrita (though sometimes believed to be related to the Evanioidea), and presently placed in a unique superfamily, Trigonaloidea, and the only extant taxon in the superfamily. The other putative related taxon is the extinct family Maimetshidae, known from the Cretaceous period.  Trigonalidae are divided into 2 subfamilies; Orthogonalinae and Trigonalinae. These wasps are extremely rare, but surprisingly diverse, with over 90 species in 16 genera, and are known from all parts of the world. It is possibly the sister group to all Aculeata.

Biology

What little is known about the biology of these insects indicates a remarkably improbable life history: in nearly all known species, females lay thousands of minute eggs, "clamping" them to the edges of, or injecting them inside leaves. The egg must then be consumed by a caterpillar. Once inside the caterpillar, the trigonalid egg either hatches and attacks any other parasitoid larvae (including its siblings) in the caterpillar, or it waits until the caterpillar is killed and fed to a vespid larva, which it then attacks. If the caterpillar is neither attacked by another parasitoid nor fed to a vespid, the trigonalid larva fails to develop. Therefore, they are parasitoids or hyperparasitoids, but in a manner virtually unique among the insects, in that the eggs must be swallowed by a host, and even more unusual in that there may be an intermediate host. A few species are known exceptions, which directly parasitise sawflies.

The fossil record of the family is poor, and there are no confirmed members of the family prior to the Cenozoic, with the oldest being from the Ypresian Eocene Okanagan Highlands in western North America. A possible specimen is known from the mid-Cretaceous Burmese amber of Myanmar, but this differs substantially from modern members of the family, and may belong to the stem-group.

Nomenclature
The name of this family has also been spelled "Trigonaloidae" and "Trigonalydiae". It has been argued that these are unjustified emendations of the name and incorrect under Article 29.5 of the ICZN. Despite this, some authors have continued to use the latter, "Trigonalyidae" spelling.

Taxonomy

Genera

 Afrigonalys
 Bakeronymus
 Bareogonalos
 Ischnogonalos
 Jezonogonalos
 Lycogaster
 Mimelogonalos
 Nomadina
 Orthogonalys
 Pseudogonalos
 Pseudonomadina
 Seminota
 Taeniogonalos
 Teranishia
 Trigonalys
 Xanthogonalos

Fossil taxa
 †Eotrigonalis

References

Notes 

Parasitica
Apocrita families